A primary urban area (PUA) is an area defined by the Department for Communities and Local Government in the United Kingdom as a statistical tool for analysing the major cities of England, originating as part of their State of the English Cities report and database. The concept of a primary urban area has also been redefined by the Centre for Cities with the University of Newcastle.

Original purpose and definition
The concept of a primary urban area was created in an attempt to enable economic and social comparisons between cities using definitions less arbitrary than the administrative boundaries of local authorities, but avoiding one problem of using the urban areas defined by the Office for National Statistics - that sprawling conurbations such as the West Yorkshire Urban Area, containing multiple distinct settlements with large degrees of physical and social independence, but that happen to touch, end up being treated as if they were a single city.

To enable this, primary urban areas are defined as being based on areas of continuous built-up land containing urban structures that are within 50 metres of each other, while urban areas only require that urban land uses should be less than 200 metres apart.

In addition, to qualify as a primary urban area a built-up area must have a population in excess of 125,000. On this basis England had 56 primary urban areas in 2007.

As primary urban areas were created to allow statistical comparisons, and the majority of statistics are produced based on administrative or electoral geographies, primary urban areas are approximated to local authority and ward level, or to an additional measure called a tract – similar in size to a ward but designed to be subject to fewer revisions over time. It is for these approximate areas that statistics are available. Wards and tracts, being smaller, allow a greater degree of precision in comparing PUAs, but using local authority-based definitions allow PUA comparisons to be made using the wider range of statistics available at this level.

Primary urban areas are designed purely as a tool of statistical analysis and aren't intended to form definitive measures of cities for policy purposes. They are named after the largest settlement within them.

Issues with primary urban areas
Primary urban areas still suffer to a certain extent from containing multiple distinct settlements with large degrees of independence, but that happen to touch being treated as if they were a single city.  A good example of this is within the Birmingham PUA, where Wolverhampton is largely independent of Birmingham and by some measures has a city-region of its own.  Whilst Birmingham dominates the south and east of the area, and Wolverhampton dominates the north and west, the area of conurbation between the two cities (the Black Country) displays a complex pattern of interdependence both within the area and to the two cities, making statistical separation of the area extremely difficult.  This inclusion of Wolverhampton demonstrates differences between PUAs and the Eurostat equivalent, where Wolverhampton has its own larger urban zone.

When primary urban areas are approximated to local authority areas rather than wards they can also contain rural areas or have parts of the urban area excluded from the relevant PUA. The Leeds PUA is an example of the former, where the City of Leeds local authority area that is contained within the PUA includes a wide rural area in addition to the urban cores; whilst the Manchester PUA does not contain Wilmslow which is a part of the Greater Manchester Urban Area but outside the local authorities that make up the approximated PUA.

Another issue with the PUA data is what constitutes a continuous urban area.  The Greater Manchester PUA for example does not include the largely urban boroughs of Wigan, Bolton and Rochdale, all of which are linked strongly with the core city region – for example by transport (via Transport for Greater Manchester), shopping/leisure e.g. Trafford Centre, various sporting events, administrative history (Greater Manchester County Council and nightlife. In Bolton for example 33 percent of the working population who live there travel outside the borough to work – 26,190 of them within Greater Manchester. Similar issues exist around many of the core cities. PUA's should therefore be regarded as only one indicator of what constitutes an urban area.

Liverpool's PUA is far smaller than the City Region and Metropolitan Area, because of the River Mersey cutting through the middle of the city. This is controversial as Birkenhead (also a part of Merseyside) is categorised as a separate primary urban area from Liverpool despite its proximity and connections to Liverpool on the opposite side of the river. This differs from the Liverpool Metropolitan Area, which includes Wirral and extends into Cheshire.

List of original primary urban areas
These were the PUAs identified by the study:

List of updated primary urban areas
In 2016, the Centre for Cities with the University of Newcastle updated the list of PUAs. They added Basildon, Exeter and Slough and removed Grimsby and Hastings, while Bolton and Rochdale were absorbed into Manchester. The following PUAs were identified by the study:

See also
 Travel to work area

References

External links
 

Geography of the United Kingdom